Glaucocharis muscela is a moth in the family Crambidae. It was described by John Fryer in 1912. It is found in the Seychelles.

References

Diptychophorini
Moths described in 1912